The Cabinet of Libya serves as the leadership for the executive branch of the government of Libya.

Ministers

Abdul Hamid Dbeibeh was selected as Prime Minister of Libya in the Libyan Political Dialogue Forum on 5 February 2021 and a list of cabinet appointees was released on 11 March 2021. The Dbeibeh Cabinet replaced the rival al-Sarraj and al-Thani cabinets.

In March 2022, Minister of Civil Service, Abdul Fattah Saleh Muhammad Al-Khawja, and the Minister of State for Immigration Affairs, Ijdid Maatouk Jadeed, resigned after the House of Representatives granted confidence to and sworn-in the rival Government of National Stability led by Fathi Bashagha.

References

Politics of Libya
Political organizations based in Libya
Government of Libya
Libya, Cabinet